Now Bahar (also Romanized as Now Bahār) is a village in Masabi Rural District, in the Central District of Sarayan County, South Khorasan Province, Iran. At the 2006 census, its population was 195, in 63 families.

References 

Populated places in Sarayan County